In machining, 2.5D refers to a surface which is a projection of a plane into 3rd dimension – although the object is 3-dimensional, there are no overhanging elements possible. Objects of this type are often represented as a contour map that gives the height (i.e., thickness or depth) of the object at each point.

2.5D objects are often greatly preferred for machining, as it is easy to generate G-code for them in an efficient, often close to optimal fashion, while optimal cutting tool paths for true 3-dimensional objects can be NP-complete (nondeterministic polynomial time complete), although many algorithms exist.

2.5D objects can be machined on a 3-axis milling machine, and do not require any of the features of a higher-axis machine to produce.

A 2.5D machine, also called a two-and-a-half-axis mill, possesses the capability to translate in all three axes but can perform the cutting operation only in two of the three axes at a time due to hardware or software limitations, or a machine that has a solenoid instead of a true, linear Z axis. A typical example involves an XY table that positions for each hole center, where the spindle (Z-axis) then completes a fixed cycle for drilling by plunging and retracting axially. The code for a 2.5D machining is significantly less than 3D contour machining, and the software and hardware requirements are (traditionally) less expensive. Drilling and tapping centers are inexpensive, limited-duty machining centers that began as a 2.5-axis market category, although many late-model ones are 3-axis because the software and hardware costs have dropped with advancing technology. 

A 2.5D image is a simplified three-dimensional (x, y, z) surface representation that contains at most one depth (z) value for every point in the (x, y) plane.

References

Computer-aided engineering